The Hilltop Lodge was a historic motel on Central Avenue (former U.S. Route 66) in Albuquerque, New Mexico, which was notable as one of the best-preserved Route 66 motels remaining in the city. It began as a small three-unit lodging in 1941, and was expanded to 12 units by owner E. H. Stopple in 1946. The property was added to the New Mexico State Register of Cultural Properties in 1997 and the National Register of Historic Places in 1998. The motel was demolished in 2003 after being shut down by the city as a nuisance property. The remainder of the site, including the neon sign, was cleared around 2017 for a realignment of Yucca Drive due to the Albuquerque Rapid Transit project.

The motel was a one-story, L-shaped building with 12 rooms. The office and manager's residence were at the front of the building, which had a decorative stepped parapet and a small porch.

References

Hotels in Albuquerque, New Mexico
Hotel buildings on the National Register of Historic Places in New Mexico
New Mexico State Register of Cultural Properties
National Register of Historic Places in Albuquerque, New Mexico
Hotel buildings completed in 1946
Motels in the United States
U.S. Route 66 in New Mexico
Demolished hotels in the United States
Buildings and structures demolished in 2003
Demolished buildings and structures in New Mexico